In promotion of their second album Sounds from Nowheresville, indie rock duo The Ting Tings embarked on a promotional tour. While their first tour included more dates and shows in Latin America, South America, and Australia, the Show Us Yours Tour contained fewer shows and remained limited to the United Kingdom and North America.

For the European leg of the tour in late 2011, the band ran a competition that allowed fans to create original artwork to be featured on the cover art of Sounds from Nowheresville. The winning entry was a drawing by Milan Abad that depicted Katie White and Jules De Martino as skeletons. Other entries were placed in the album insert. Remix stems of the song "Hang It Up" were also made available on their website with which fans could create their own remixes of the song and submit them. All the entered remixes were uploaded onto the band's SoundCloud account. Two of the nine submitted remixes: the Inertia remix and CKB remix, were included as bonus tracks on the deluxe edition of the album.

Setlist

Opening act
 MNDR
 Charli XCX

Tour dates

References

2011 concert tours
2012 concert tours